André Colomer (1886–1931) was a French poet, anarchist and later Communist activist.

Works 

 Roland Malmos (novel)
 Le Réfractaire (drama in three acts)
 Bonimini contre le fascisme
 Répression de l'anarchisme en Russie soviétique (1923),
 À nous deux, Patrie!: la conquête de soi-même (memoirs), 1925

References 

 The information in this article is based on that in its French equivalent.

1886 births
1931 deaths
French anarchists
French male poets
20th-century French poets
Lycée Lakanal teachers
20th-century French male writers
French Communist Party members